The 1994–95 C.D. Veracruz season is the 51st campaign in existence and 6th consecutive season in the top flight division of Mexican football.

Summary
In summertime the club sold several players due to the Mexican peso crisis included midfielder Joaquin del Olmo to America,  Picas Becerril to Necaxa, midfielder Ruben Omar Romano returned to Atlante FC,  and Argentine Forward Jorge Comas. On the contrary, the arrivals were not promising: Brazilian Forward Leonel Bolsonello, goalkeeper Bautista from Pumas UNAM, Jose Luis Malibran from Toros Neza, Brazilian Forward Marquinho and defender Paco Ramirez from Necaxa. In his second year as head coach Anibal Ruiz finished in a decent 9th spot on mid-table, thanks to a mediocre group with Atlante FC and Morelia the squad qualified to post-season repechaje round. The playing of the squad was aimed by goalkeeper Adolfo Rios and the defensive line with Paco Ramirez and Jose Luis Gonzalez China saving several points in favor, meanwhile the offensive line had a poor performance with Bolsonello being a major flop.

In repechaje, the team was defeated by regional rivals Puebla FC after a two leg series.

Finally, the squad reached the 1994-95 Copa Mexico Final losing the trophy against Necaxa with a 0–2 score.

After the new Federal government arrived in December 1994 with President Ernesto Zedillo, former Secretariat of the Interior and Veracruz native Fernando Gutierrez Barrios linked to ex-President Carlos Salinas de Gortari along the minority of shareholders of the club were attempting to sell the club during the campaign and, in June 1995, concluded the sale to TV Azteca which bought the 75% of shares from State Government. It was the end of an era in the club beginning in 1989 when State Government, Gutierrez Barrios and minority private partners acquired the franchise of Potros Neza and moved it to Veracruz.

Squad

Transfers

Winter

Competitions

La Liga

League table

Group 1

Results by round

General table

Matches

Repechaje

References

External links

1994-95 season
Mexican football clubs 1994–95 season
1994–95 Mexican Primera División season
1994–95 in Mexican football